Senator Weeks may refer to:

Members of the United States Senate
John W. Weeks (1860–1926), U.S. Senator from Massachusetts from 1913 to 1919
Sinclair Weeks (1893–1972), U.S. Senator from Massachusetts in 1944

U.S. state senate members
Harold E. Weeks (c. 1890–1939), Maine State Senate
John E. Weeks (1853–1949), Vermont State Senate
Russ Weeks (born 1942), West Virginia State Senate
Thompson Weeks (1832–1901), Wisconsin State Senate